The Kit Carson House is a historic house museum at 113 Kit Carson Road in central Taos, New Mexico.  Built in 1825, it was from 1843 until his death the home of frontiersman Kit Carson (1809-1868).  A good example of Spanish Colonial architecture, it is now owned by the local Masonic fraternity, and serves as a museum dedicated to Carson's life.  It was designated a National Historic Landmark in 1963.

Description and history
The Kit Carson House stands a short way east of Taos's central plaza, on the north side of Kit Carson Road. It is a modest single-story adobe structure, built in 1825, that is an east-facing U shape with a central courtyard. The oldest portion of the house consists of the front three rooms, and the next room to the north.

Kit Carson grew up in the frontier west, and became renowned as a fur trapper and guide on numerous United States Army expeditions against Native Americans and also during the American Civil War. In 1843 he married Josefa Jaramillo, who was from a leading Taos family, and purchased this house. It remained the couple's principal home until 1868. They were away from it 1851-54 and 1866–67, when Carson was stationed elsewhere. In early 1868 the family moved to the Colorado Territory, where both died.

The Kit Carson house was passed through a string of owners between Kit Carson’s death in 1868 and the acquisition of the property by Bent Lodge #42 (a masonic lodge founded by Kit Carson) in 1910.  The house had degraded and remained in a state of disrepair until 1952 when the Kit Carson Memorial Foundation Inc was established to restore and rehabilitate the property.  The foundation now operates the property as a house-museum where visitors can take tours, purchase souvenirs, and learn about Carson’s exploits in life.

Current State of the Kit Carson House 
The Kit Carson house is styled and furnished in the Spanish Colonial Style, and most of the house's rooms have been restored to fit within that style, matching their original condition as closely as possible.  The restorations go so far as to include authentic recreations of furniture from the time. Additionally, several artifacts surrounding the life of Kit Carson and his family have been incorporated throughout the property, including a replica of his .50 caliber rifle, a United States Army sabre with its scabbard, and Josefa's sewing box.

The museum constructed around the house includes a full guided tour which tells visitors about Carson's life, death, and other important details and achievements of his.  One of the first stops in the tour includes a 20 minute video on the History Channel that is all about Kit Carson and what he accomplished.  It culminates at the nearby Kit Carson Memorial State Park, where the graves of Carson and his wife, Josefa, can be found. The house has also undergone several additions, such as a gift shop and bookstore which supports the mission of the foundation and the museum itself.

Awards & Achievements 

 In July of 1963, the National Park Service approved the Kit Carson House for National Historic Landmark Status
 In October of 1963, the Kit Carson Memorial Foundation Inc. was awarded an AASLH (American Association for State and Local History) Award of Merit for their efforts to preserve and restore the Kit Carson House

Appearances in Academic Literature 
Prairie Schooner is a literary publication put out by the University of Nebraska since 1926.  The Kit Carson House appears within Vol. 42 No. 2 (Summer 1968) during an expedition to find D. H. Lawrence's ranch in Taos detailed in an article called The Spinsters of Taos.

See also

National Register of Historic Places listings in Taos County, New Mexico
List of National Historic Landmarks in New Mexico

References

External links

Adobe buildings and structures in New Mexico
Biographical museums in New Mexico
Buildings and structures in Taos, New Mexico
Historic American Buildings Survey in New Mexico
Historic house museums in New Mexico
Houses completed in 1825
Houses on the National Register of Historic Places in New Mexico
National Historic Landmarks in New Mexico
Museums in Taos, New Mexico
1825 establishments in Mexico
Houses in Taos County, New Mexico
National Register of Historic Places in Taos County, New Mexico